State Road 65 crosses in four counties in the southwest portion of the U.S. State of Indiana.

Route description
State Road 65 begins at State Road 66 west of Evansville.  It arcs to the northwest to the town of Cynthiana and State Road 68, then proceeds north through Owensville to State Road 64.  It shares this route east into Princeton to the Gibson County Courthouse Square where it turns north then proceeds northeast to its terminus at State Road 56 west of Petersburg, just inside Pike County.

Major intersections

References

External links

065
Transportation in Gibson County, Indiana
Transportation in Pike County, Indiana
Transportation in Posey County, Indiana
Transportation in Vanderburgh County, Indiana